The Peugeot 905 is a sports-prototype racing car built by Peugeot's racing department, Peugeot Talbot Sport.

The car was initially unveiled in February 1990 and was developed throughout 1990 before making its race debut in the final two races of the 1990 World Sportscar Championship season (Montréal and Mexico).

The car won the 24 Hours of Le Mans endurance race in 1992 with the team of Derek Warwick, Yannick Dalmas, and Mark Blundell.  This win was followed  in 1993 by the team of Geoff Brabham, Christophe Bouchut, and Éric Hélary, in the 905B. In addition to that, the car won both the driver’s and the team’s title at the World Sportscar Championship in 1992.

The Peugeot 905 participated in 17 races in its career, winning 9 of them.

History

Inception 
In November 1988 Peugeot Talbot Sport, established under the control of Jean Todt at Vélizy-Villacoublay, in the suburbs of Paris, announced the launch of the 905 project to compete in the 1991 World Sportscar Championship using the new rules which the 1991 season would introduce.

Technically advanced, the 905 used a carbon fiber chassis engineered by Dassault and a light alloy SA35-A1 3499 cc naturally aspirated V10 engine that was similar to F1 engines of the time. The 905 was built at Vélizy-Villacoublay  and was officially unveiled on the 4th of July 1990 at the Circuit de Nevers Magny-Cours, with Jean-Pierre Jabouille driving.

The car made its racing debut in the final two races of the 1990 season with Jabouille and Keke Rosberg sharing the wheel. Although the car was slower than the contemporary Group C Sports Prototypes, it was notably quicker than the other 3.5 litre Sports-Prototypes which raced in that season.

1991 season 

The 905 began its first full season in the World Sportscar Championship in 1991. Although the car was now quicker than the 1990 version, and indeed the heavily penalised Group C cars that were allowed to race, in the early part of the season the 905 suffered some performance and reliability problems but, more crucially for Peugeot, the car was a lot slower than the standard-setting Jaguar XJR-14 - a car that was able to match the lap times of most contemporary F1 cars (but not those of top cars such the Williams-Renault and McLaren-Honda cars that were at least 2 to 3 seconds faster per lap).

The car was, however, able to obtain a lucky win at the Suzuka Circuit. Unfortunately, at the 1991 24 Hours of Le Mans, both cars entered did not last past the four-hour mark.

To counter Jaguar in the remaining races of the championship the 905 was heavily revised, primarily in aerodynamics. Carrying over only the cockpit of the previous car, the evolutionary 905B was created. With the more notable changes consisting of a two-tier rear wing and an optional full-width front wing, including a more powerful SA35-A2 engine, the 905B made its race debut at the Nürburgring round of the 1991 series. These advancements allowed the team to finish the year winning at Magny-Cours and Mexico with back-to-back 1-2 wins, thus completing the season in second place overall.

1992 season 

The 905B became one of only two factory efforts involved in the 1992 World Sportscar Championship season alongside Toyota, who were competing in their first season under the 3.5-litre regulations using the TS010. This meant that only the 1992 24 Hours of Le Mans showed a strong competition among the Group C cars. The 905B was successful, bringing 2 of the team's 3 cars home in 1st and 3rd overall.

1993 season 

For 1993, the World Sportscar Championship ceased to exist but were permitted to run at Le Mans in 1993 and 1994.  However, prior to the announcement of its cancellation, Peugeot had begun the development of the 905 Evolution 2 to compete in the 1993 season.  This car, which was tested for a few laps in practice at the final race of the 1992 season at Magny-Cours was never finished, leaving Peugeot to concentrate solely on 1993 24 Hours of Le Mans with the Evo 1B.  They were able to make a historic win by sweeping the first three positions. Following this dominance, Peugeot pulled out of sportscar racing.

Peugeot decided to switch to Formula One, using the same 3.5L V10 from the 905 that was easily adjusted to F1 regulations. In 1994, Peugeot debuted as an engine supplier with the McLaren team and remained in F1 until the end of the 2000 season, when, after little success, they decided to concentrate on the World Rally Championship, where their factory team had had some success, winning the title on several occasions. However, Peugeot withdrew its works WRC operation at the end of the 2005 season, and returned to Le Mans for the 2007 24 Hours, with the new 908 HDi FAP prototype entry.

Specifications 

 Manufacturer 	 	Peugeot
 First race 	 	1990
 Category 	 	Group C1
 Engine 	 	80°  V10, 40 valves
 Output 	 	 @ 12,500 rpm (905B produced approximately )
 Transmission         6-speed sequential manual, mid-engine, rear-wheel-drive
 Chassis 	 	Carbon fiber Monocoque
 Length 	 	
 Width 	 	
 Height 	 	
 Weight 	 	
 Tires 	 	Michelin 32x63x17 & 34x70x18

Le Mans results 

 1991
 #5 Baldi - Alliot - Jabouille - Did Not Finish (Engine) (Baldi didn't drive)
 #6 Dalmas - Rosberg - Raphanel - Did Not Finish (Transmission)
 1992
 #1 Dalmas - Warwick - Blundell - 1st (352 laps - 4787.2 km at an average speed of 199.34 km/h)
 #2 Baldi - Alliot - Jabouille - 3rd
 #31 Ferté - Van de Poele - Wendlinger - Did Not Finish (Engine)
 1993
 #3 Bouchut - Hélary - Brabham - 1st (375 laps - 5,100 km at an average speed of 213.358 km/h)
 #1 Dalmas - Boutsen - Fabi - 2nd
 #2 Baldi - Alliot - Jabouille - 3rd

Other results 

 Suzuka 1991  Baldi - Alliot - 1st
 Magny Cours 1991  Rosberg - Dalmas - 1st
 Baldi - Alliot - 2nd
 Mexico 1991  Rosberg - Dalmas - 1st
 Baldi - Alliot - 2nd
 Silverstone 1992  Warwick - Dalmas - 1st
 Donington 1992  Baldi - Alliot - 1st
 Warwick - Dalmas - 2nd
 Suzuka 1992  Warwick - Dalmas - 1st
 Magny Cours 1992  Baldi - Alliot - 1st
 Bouchut - Hélary - 2nd

References

905
Group C cars
24 Hours of Le Mans race cars
Le Mans winning cars
Sports prototypes